Shantanu Mishra (born 30 May 1994) is an Indian cricketer. He made his first-class debut for Odisha in the 2017–18 Ranji Trophy on 1 November 2017. He made his List A debut for Odisha in the 2017–18 Vijay Hazare Trophy on 13 February 2018. He made his Twenty20 debut for Odisha in the 2018–19 Syed Mushtaq Ali Trophy on 2 March 2019.

References

External links
 

1994 births
Living people
Indian cricketers
Odisha cricketers
Sportspeople from Bhubaneswar
Cricketers from Odisha